The Cult of the Supreme Being was a form of deism established in France by Maximilien Robespierre during the French Revolution. It was intended to become the state religion of the new French Republic and a replacement for Roman Catholicism and its rival, the Cult of Reason. It went unsupported after the fall of Robespierre and was officially proscribed by First Consul Napoleon Bonaparte in 1802.

Origins 
The French Revolution had occasioned many radical changes in France, but one of the most fundamental for the hitherto Catholic nation was the official rejection of religion. The first new major organized school of thought emerged under the umbrella name of the Cult of Reason. Advocated by radicals like Jacques Hébert and Antoine-François Momoro, the Cult of Reason distilled a mixture of largely atheistic views into an anthropocentric philosophy. No gods at all were worshipped in the Cult of Reason—the guiding principle was devotion to the abstract concept of Reason itself.

This rejection of all godhead appalled Maximilien Robespierre. Though he was no admirer of Catholicism, he had a special dislike for atheism. He thought that belief in a supreme being was important for social order, and he liked to quote Voltaire: "If God did not exist, it would be necessary to invent him". To him, the Cult of Reason's philosophical offenses were compounded by the "scandalous scenes" and "wild masquerades" attributed to its practice. In late 1793, Robespierre delivered a fiery denunciation of the Cult of Reason and of its proponents and proceeded to give his own vision of proper Revolutionary religion. Devised almost entirely by Robespierre, the Cult of the Supreme Being was authorized by the National Convention on 7 May 1794 as the civic religion of France.

Religious tenets 
Robespierre believed that reason is only a means to an end, and the singular end is virtue. He sought to move beyond simple deism (often described as Voltairean by its adherents) to a new and, in his view, more rational devotion to the godhead. The primary principles of the Cult of the Supreme Being were a belief in the existence of a god and the immortality of the human soul. Though not inconsistent with Christian doctrine, these beliefs were put to the service of Robespierre's fuller meaning, which was of a type of civic-minded, public virtue he attributed to the Greeks and Romans. This type of virtue could only be attained through active fidelity to liberty and democracy. Belief in a living god and a higher moral code, he said, were "constant reminders of justice" and thus essential to a republican society.

On 7 May 1794, the National Convention established the Worship of the Supreme Being; the opening clauses of the Decree Establishing the Worship of the Supreme Being of the 18th Floréal of the Year II declared:

The French People recognize the existence of the Supreme Being and the Immortality of the Soul.

They declare that the best service of the Supreme Being is the practice of man's duties.

They set among the most important of these duties the detestation of bad faith and tyranny, by punishing tyrants and traitors, by caring for the unfortunate, respecting the weak, defending the oppressed, doing unto others all the good one can, and not being unjust towards anyone.

Revolutionary impact 
Robespierre used the religious issue to publicly denounce the motives of many radicals not in his camp, and it led, directly or indirectly, to the executions of Revolutionary de-Christianisers like Hébert, Momoro, and Anacharsis Cloots. The establishment of the Cult of the Supreme Being represented the beginning of the reversal of the wholesale de-Christianization process that had been looked upon previously with official favour. Simultaneously it marked the apogee of Robespierre's power. Though in theory he was just an equal member of the Committee of Public Safety, Robespierre at this point possessed an unrivalled national prominence.

Festival of the Supreme Being

To inaugurate the new state religion, Robespierre declared that 20 Prairial Year II (8 June 1794) would be the first day of national celebration of the Supreme Being, and future republican holidays were to be held every tenth day—the days of rest (décadi) in the new French Republican Calendar. Every locality was mandated to hold a commemorative event, but the event in Paris was designed on a massive scale. The festival was organized by the artist Jacques-Louis David and took place around a man-made mountain on the Champ de Mars. Robespierre assumed full leadership of the event, forcefully—and, to many, ostentatiously—declaring the truth and "social utility" of his new religion. While earlier Revolutionary festivals were more spontaneous, the Festival of the Supreme Being was meticulously planned. Historian Mona Ozouf has noted how the "creaking stiffness" of the event has been seen by some to foreshadow "the sclerosis of the Revolution."

Legacy 
The Cult of the Supreme Being and its festival may have contributed to the Thermidorian Reaction and the downfall of Robespierre. According to Madame de Staël, it was from that time he was lost. With his death at the guillotine on 28 July 1794, the cult lost all official sanction and disappeared from public view. It was officially banned by Napoleon Bonaparte on 8 April 1802 with his Law on Cults of 18 Germinal, Year X.

See also
Cult of Reason
Deism
Dechristianisation of France during the French Revolution
Gottgläubig
God-Building
Theophilanthropy

Notes

References

Bibliography

 

 

Robespierre, Maximilien. 1793 [Year 2 of the Republic]. "The Festival of the Supreme Being," translated by M. Abidor. Receuil d'hymnes Républicaines. Paris: Chez Barba.

Further reading 

 

Halsall, Paul. [1996 January 26]  2020 January 21. "Maximilien Robespierre: The Cult of the Supreme Being" (rev.). Internet Modern History Sourcebook. New York: Fordham University.
Robespierre, Maximilien. 1793 [Year 2 of the Republic]. "The Festival of the Supreme Being," translated by M. Abidor. Receuil d'hymnes Républicaines. Paris: Chez Barba.

External links
The Festival of the Supreme Being at marxists.org Robespierre's two speeches at the Festival In English

1794 events of the French Revolution
Anti-Catholicism in France
Conceptions of God
Deism
Maximilien Robespierre
Religion and the French Revolution
Religious organizations disestablished in the 18th century
Religious organizations established in 1794